Sayeh Kor-e Sofla (also Romanized as Sāyeh Kor-e Soflá and Sāyehkor-e Soflá; also known as Sādeh Kor-e Soflá, Sāikūr, Sāyeh Gor-e Pā’īn, Sāyeh Kor-e Pā’īn, Sayeh Kūr-e Pā’īn, and Sāyeh Kūr-e Soflá) is a village in Agahan Rural District, Kolyai District, Sonqor County, Kermanshah Province, Iran. At the 2006 census, its population was 277, in 74 families.

References 

Populated places in Sonqor County